The Cathedral of Our Lady of Lourdes is a Catholic cathedral in Spokane, Washington, United States.  It is the seat of the Diocese of Spokane. It is listed on the National Register of Historic Places as a contributing property to the Riverside Avenue Historic District, and its adjacent rectory building is listed as a secondary contributing property to the district.

History
Our Lady of Lourdes Parish can trace its beginnings to the first Mass celebrated in Spokane.  The Rev. Joseph Cataldo, SJ celebrated the Mass in August 1881 in a converted carpenter's shop that he named St. Joseph.  Five years later a brick church was constructed and named Our Lady of Lourdes.  The Sisters of the Holy Names opened a parish school.  The cornerstone for the present church building was laid in 1903.  A new school building was completed three years later.  On December 17, 1913, St. Pius X established the Diocese of Spokane and Our Lady of Lourdes was named the diocesan cathedral.

Architecture

The cathedral is designed in an Italian Romanesque Revival style. The exterior of the structure is faced with red brick accented with granite. The interior was most recently renovated in 2019 when the sanctuary was covered in marble and a new marble altar and pews were installed. The new marble altar was a gift of Tim and Sherry Murphy in memory of their families. The old high altar, topped by a Calvary scene, remains in the apse. It was a gift of the Patsy Clarke family of Spokane. The bishop's cathedra (chair) is a combination of the original 1913 throne of Bishop Schinner, the marble cathedra from the 1930s and a new addition in 2018. The bishop's cathedra is a gift from the Dennis and Stacy Harrington family in memory of Deacon John Sicilia. The restored marble pulpit was made possible through the generosity of Mr. and Mrs. Paul Redmond. The cathedral has one organ in the loft  W. W. Kimball pipe organ. The stained glass windows are from Bavaria.

See also
List of Catholic cathedrals in the United States
List of cathedrals in the United States

References

External links

Official Cathedral Site
Roman Catholic Diocese of Spokane Official Site

Religious organizations established in 1881
Roman Catholic churches completed in 1908
Our Lady of Lourdes, Spokane
Roman Catholic Diocese of Spokane
Roman Catholic churches in Washington (state)
Churches in Spokane County, Washington
Buildings and structures in Spokane, Washington
Romanesque Revival church buildings in Washington (state)
1881 establishments in Washington Territory
20th-century Roman Catholic church buildings in the United States